Anaparthi (formerly Anapothavaram) is a Town located in Anaparthy mandal, in East Godavari district of the Indian state of Andhra Pradesh. The town was named after King Anapotha Reddy(1353 AD–1364 AD) of the Rajamahendravaram Dynasty(1325 AD - 1448 AD). Almost all the residents of this Town are of the same social Forward open community Reddy, (Bhumanchi Reddy) .

Agriculture 
Anaparti has two canals of River Godavari waters, providing vast areas of agricultural lands. Major crops cultivated in the area include paddy, palm oil, sugarcane and groundnuts.

Demographics 
The local language is the Telugu language. 

According to census figures, the total population of Anaparthi is 25,533, of which 12,856 are male and 12,677 are female. The total area of Anaparthi is 1807 hectares.

Geography 

The closest cities to Anaparthi are Rajamundry and the coast town Kakinada.

Transport 

The Anaparti railway station is classified as a D–category station in the Vijayawada railway division of South Central Railway zone.

References 

Cities and towns in East Godavari district